Northern Pennine Club (NPC) is one of the oldest and largest caving clubs in the UK. Founded in 1946, the Northern Pennine Club was one of the caving clubs started by various cavers affected by the politics of the British Speleological Association immediately after the Second World War. Whilst the Red Rose Cave and Pothole Club was mainly formed of cavers from Lancaster, the NPC gained many of its members from Leeds.

Notable discoveries
 Penyghent Pot
 Magnetometer Pot
 Hammer Pot
 Echo Pot
 Link Pot
 Notts II

Publications

See also 

 Caving in the United Kingdom

References

External links
 Northern Pennine Club website

Caving organisations in the United Kingdom